Daisuke Miyao is a professor of Japanese films at the University of Oregon and the University of California San Diego. He is also the author of Sessue Hayakawa: Silent Cinema and Transnational Stardom and The Aesthetics of Shadow: Lighting and Japanese Cinema, editor of Oxford Handbook of Japanese Cinema and co-translator of Ozu's Anti-Cinema.

References

Living people
University of Oregon faculty
University of California, San Diego faculty
Year of birth missing (living people)
Place of birth missing (living people)
People from Tokyo
Japanese emigrants to the United States